Dieter Fänger (12 October 1925 – 8 March 2016) was a German fencer. He represented the United Team of Germany at the 1960 Summer Olympics in the individual and team épée events.

References

1925 births
2016 deaths
German male fencers
Olympic fencers of the United Team of Germany
Fencers at the 1960 Summer Olympics
Sportspeople from Wuppertal